Hunger is a 2001 film written and directed by Maria Giese, based upon the 1890 novel of the same title by Norwegian author Knut Hamsun.

Shot in Denmark on a shoestring budget, it features Joseph Culp as well as his father  Robert Culp in a supporting role.

The score was composed by Kazimir Boyle and Trevor Morris, who went on to compose music for The Tudors and Vikings

Premise
A sensitive writer from a small town faces spiritual crisis as he tries to make it as a Hollywood screenwriter. Charlie Pontus wanders around Los Angeles torn between his efforts to sell a screenplay and find his next meal. His natural optimism keeps him afloat as he walks the tightrope between his love for the beautiful, exotic Ylayali and his desperate connection to The Chief, the Hollywood producer who has the power to give life or take it away. Stubbornly refusing to relinquish his principles, he sinks deeper and deeper into spiritual crisis, finally confronting God in a Jobian showdown. Ultimately, the story illustrates the difficult balance between artistic integrity and the commercial necessities of Hollywood.

Cast
 Joseph Culp as Charlie Pontus
 Robert Culp as The Chief
 Kathleen Luong as Ylayali
 Daniel Franklin as "Eclair"
 Casper Andreas as "Scissors"
 James Quill as "The Duke"
 Bruce Solomon as Mr. Christie
 Frank Bruynbroek as Spy Man #1
 Jason Berlin as Spy Man #2
 Susan Rich as Sexy Woman
 Nicole Ozment as Hostess

References

External links 
 
 

2001 films
2001 drama films
Films based on works by Knut Hamsun
Films based on Norwegian novels
American drama films
2000s American films